Sterling Publishing Company, Inc. is a publisher of a broad range of subject areas, with multiple imprints and more than 5,000 titles in print. Founded in 1949 by David A. Boehm, Sterling also publishes books for a number of brands, including AARP, Hasbro, Hearst Magazines, and USA TODAY, as well as serves as the North American distributor for domestic and international publishers including: Anova, the Brooklyn Botanic Garden, Carlton Books, Duncan Baird, Guild of Master Craftsmen, the Orion Publishing Group, and Sixth & Spring Books.  Sterling also owns and operates two verticals, Lark Crafts and Pixiq.

Sterling Publishing is a wholly owned subsidiary of Barnes & Noble, which acquired it in 2003. On January 5, 2012, The Wall Street Journal reported that Barnes & Noble had put its Sterling Publishing business up for sale. Negotiations failed to produce a buyer, however, and Sterling is reportedly no longer for sale as of March, 2012.

In January 2022, Sterling rebranded as Union Square & Co. In March 2022, Sterling acquired the British children's publisher Boxer Books, one of its distribution clients.

Notable authors
Sterling's authors include Colleen Houck, Paul McKenna, Richard Scarry, Barton Seaver, Paul Sloane, Peter Yarrow, and Kevin Zraly.

References

External links 
Union Square & Co. website

Barnes & Noble
Book publishing companies based in New York (state)
Publishing companies established in 1949